Robert Ballard II (c.1572 or 1575 – after 1650) was a prominent French lutenist and composer. Probably born in Paris, his father, Robert Ballard Senior (c.1527–1588) was the head of the well-known music publishers "Le Roy & Ballard", founded in 1551 with cousin Adrian Le Roy (a notable virtuoso lutenist and composer of the period).

From 1612 he entered the service of the French Regent Maria de Medici and was tutor to the young King Louis XIII, becoming a lutenist and composer ("Musicien ordinaire du roi") at the royal court in 1618. He published two books of lute works: Premier Livre de tablature de luth (1611) and Diverses Pièces mises sur le luth (1614).

References

External links 
Lute Tablature Wayne Cripps archive.
Lute Tablature Sarge Gerbode archive.

Performance links 
Courante (Lute)
Courante (Guitar)
Bransles de Village (Lute)

1570s births
17th-century deaths
17th-century classical composers
French Baroque composers
Composers for lute
French lutenists
French classical musicians
French male classical composers
17th-century male musicians